Zeta Capricorni, Latinised from ζ Capricorni, is a binary star system in the southern constellation of Capricornus. It is visible to the naked eye with an apparent visual magnitude of 3.77. The system is located at a distance of approximately 386 light-years from the Sun based on parallax. It is drifting further away with a radial velocity of +2 km/s. The absolute magnitude of this system is −1.59.

Properties
The binary nature of this system was announced in 1980 by Erika Böhm-Vitense based on an ultraviolet excess attributed to a white dwarf companion. It is a single-lined spectroscopic binary system. It was flagged as a suspected eclipsing binary in 1988 due to observed variations in the light curve.

The primary, designated component A, has a stellar classification of G4Ib: Ba2. This notation indicates this is a yellow-hued supergiant star, although the ':' means there is some uncertainty about the class. The temperature and surface gravity of this object suggests it may be a horizontal-branch star. It is considered a prototypical example of a Barium star, as indicated by the 'Ba2' class suffix. The properties of these objects include overabundances of carbon molecules (such as C2) and s-process elements. Zeta Capricorni has an overabundance of the s-process element praseodymium.

Its companion, component B, is a carbon-oxygen white dwarf with a hydrogen-rich atmosphere and a class of DA2.2. In the course of its evolution, the progenitor star passed through the thermally pulsing asymptotic giant branch, during which the enlarged atmosphere transferred material to the primary. The abundance of niobium in the primary's atmosphere, a product of the decay of zirconium-93, is at a level that suggests the transfer to the primary took place more than three million years ago.

A magnitude 12.5 visual companion was discovered by T. J. J. See in 1897. As of 1997, it was located at an angular separation of  along a position angle of 12°.

Chinese name
Consequently, the Chinese name for ζ Capricorni itself represents the state of Yan, together with ν Ophiuchi in Left Wall of Heavenly Market Enclosure (asterism).

References

G-type supergiants
White dwarfs
Barium stars
Horizontal-branch stars
Spectroscopic binaries

Capricornus (constellation)
Capricorni, Zeta
CD-22 15388
Capricorni, 34
204075
105881
8204